(born July 15, 1962 in Tokyo, Japan) is a Japanese writer, primarily of fantasy books, for which she has won many awards.

Uehashi is also Professor of Ethnology at Kawamura Gakuen Women's University, having completed a PhD focusing on the Yamatji, an indigenous Australian people.

Biography
Uehashi's career as a writer started in 1989. She then wrote the novel . This novel received an award from the Japanese Association of Writers for Children, which made her one of the famous Japanese-fantasy authors.

In 1996, she published the first book of her Moribito series, . The novel received the Noma Children's Literature New Face Prize and the Sankei Children's Culture and Publishing award and the English translation was awarded the Mildred L. Batchelder Award in 2009. In 1999, Uehashi published the second book of the Moribito series, . With this novel she received the Japanese Association of Writers for Children's award. In 2002 The Guardian series won the Iwaya Sazanami literature award, and in 2003,  won another Japanese award from the Shogakukan publishing company. Then, in 2003, Uehashi wrote the novel , which received a Noma Children's Literature award. In 2006 she wrote the two volume , which she complemented with two more volumes in 2009.

Both Moribito: Guardian of the Spirit and the first two volumes of The Beast Player have had anime adaptations, in 2007 and 2009, respectively. Moribito: Guardian of the Spirit has also been made into a radio drama and The Beast Player into a manga. The first two books in the series were translated to English and won the Mildred L. Batchelder Award from the American Library Association, the first volume in 2009, and the second, in 2010.

For her "lasting contribution" as a children's writer, Uehashi won the biennial, international Hans Christian Andersen Award in 2014.
Announced late in March, it will be presented on 10 September at the annual conference of the International Board on Books for Young People (IBBY) in Mexico City.
According to the IBBY jury chaired by María Jesús Gil of Spain, "Uehashi tells stories that are replete with imagination, culture and the beauty of a sophisticated process and form. Her literary subjects are based on ancient Japanese mythology and science-fiction fantasy that are deeply rooted in human reality."

She has been called "a highly popular fantasy writer for young adults" in Japan.

Works in English translation
 Moribito series (Guardian series)
Moribito: Guardian of the Spirit (original title: Seirei no Moribito), translated by Cathy Hirano (Arthur A. Levine Books, June 2008)
 Moribito II: Guardian of the Darkness (original title: Yami no Moribito), translated by Cathy Hirano (Arthur A. Levine Books, May 2009)
The Beast Player
The Beast Player (original title: Kemono no Sōja), translated by Cathy Hirano (Henry Holt and Co., March 2019)
The Beast Warrior (original title: Kemono no Sōja), translated by Cathy Hirano (Henry Holt and Co., July 2020)

Bibliography

The Guardian series

Novels
 , 1996
 Kaiseisha, July 1996, 
 Shincho Bunko, March 2007, 
 , 1999
 Kaiseisha, January 1999, 
 Shincho Bunko, July 2007, 
 , 2000
 Kaiseisha, May 2000, 
 Shincho Bunko, December 2007, 
 , 2001
 Kaiseisha, July 2001, 
 Shincho Bunko, July 2008, 
 , 2003
 Kaiseisha, January 2003, 
 Shincho Bunko, August 2009, 
 , 2003
 Kaiseisha, January 2003, 
 Shincho Bunko, August 2009, 
 , 2005
 Kaiseisha, April 2005, 
 Shincho Bunko, August 2010, 
 , 2006
 Kaiseisha, November 2006, 
 Shincho Bunko, May 2011, 
 , 2007
 Kaiseisha, January 2007, 
 Shincho Bunko, May 2011, 
 , 2007
 Kaiseisha, February 2007, 
 Shincho Bunko, May 2011, 
Short story collections
 , 2008
 Kaiseisha, April 2008, 
 Shincho Bunko, August 2013, 
 , 2012
 Kaiseisha, January 2012,

The Beast Player series

Novels
 , 2006
 Kodansha, November 2006, 
 Kodansha Bunko, August 2009, 
 , 2006
 Kodansha, November 2006, 
 Kodansha Bunko, August 2009, 
 , 2009
 Kodansha, August 2009, 
 Kodansha Bunko, August 2012, 
 , 2009
 Kodansha, August 2009, 
 Kodansha Bunko, August 2012, 
Short story collection
 , 2010
 Kodansha, September 2010, 
 Kodansha Bunko, October 2013,

The Deer King series

Novels
 Shika no o jokan: ikinokotta mono (The Deer King I: Survivors), 2014
 Part 1
 Kadokawa, June 2017, 
 Part 2
 Kadokawa, June 2017, 
 Shikano o gekan: kaette iku mono (The Deer King II: Returnees), 2014
 Part 1
 Kadokawa, July 2017, 
 Part 2
 Kadokawa, July 2017, 
 Shika no o: minasoko no hashi (The Deer King : Bridge Underwater), 2019
 Kadokawa, March 2019,

Standalone fantasy novels
 , 1989
 Kaiseisha, 1989, 
 Kaiseisha, 2004,  (revised edition)
In the far future, when the earth was completely polluted and people could no longer live on it, human beings spread out onto other planets. For the Planet Nira, where Shin Yamano lives, it's the 200th anniversary since humans first settled on it. But something is wrong. Shin's cousin Licia suddenly awakens to the ESP-like ability of the Roshnars, an aboriginal tribe of Nira that was said to have been extinct ages ago....
 , 1991
 Kaiseisha, 1991, 
 Kaiseisha Bunko, 2000, 
Torn between the love of the god of the Moon Forest and the need of her tribe to kill the very same god, the young oracle girl Kishime is distressed. Her tribe talks of killing the god and felling the sacred forest for rich harvest. But should she listen to the urgent needs of her tribe, or should she fulfill her duty as the oracle of the god of the forest?
 , 2003
 Rironsha, 2003, 
 Shincho Bunko, 2006, 
The young girl, Sayo has inherited the ability of "hearing" people's minds from her mother. In her childhood, she had once saved a fox cub from some hunter's hounds. But that fox was a werefox that lives between the world of the gods and this world, owned by human, sent to kill a lord. Despite her will, Sayo is dragged into the ugly fight between two countries...

Ethnology
 , 2000
 Chikuma Shobo, May 2000, 
 Chikuma Bunko, September 2010, 
Uehashi's only book as an ethnologist. About Aborigines who live in town with the white-skinned Australians. When you first look at them, these people seem to have no difference from the white Australians, but something is different....

References

External links
 Nahoko Uehashi Official Website 
 Moribito novels 
 Moribito anime 
 Nahoko Uehashi at J'Lit Books from Japan 
 
 

1962 births
Japanese children's writers
Japanese women children's writers
Japanese ethnologists
Japanese fantasy writers
Rikkyo University alumni
Hans Christian Andersen Award for Writing winners
Living people